Anthony Bacon may refer to:
 Anthony Bacon (1558–1601), member of the English Bacon family and spy during the Elizabethan era
 Anthony Bacon (industrialist) (1717–1786), English-born industrialist
 Anthony Bushby Bacon (1772–1827), industrialist, landed gentleman (and illegitimate son of the above)
 Anthony Bacon (British Army officer) (1796–1864), cavalry officer and commander in the Napoleonic wars (and son of the above)

See also
Tony Bacon, Table football player